Oscar Johnson may refer to:

Oscar Johnson (baseball) (1895–1960), Negro leagues baseball player
Oscar G. Johnson (1921–1998), United States Army soldier
Oscar Johnson (tennis), tennis player
Oscar Johnson (businessman) (c. 1863–1916), American businessman